Enteromius clauseni is a species of ray-finned fish in the genus Enteromius which is known from only a single location on the Yewa River in Nigeria and Benin.

The fish is named in honor of ichthyologist Herluf Stenholt Clausen who collected the type specimen.

Footnotes 

 

Enteromius
Taxa named by Thys van den Audenaerde
Fish described in 1976